Chase Center is an indoor arena in the Mission Bay neighborhood of San Francisco, California. The building is the home venue for the Golden State Warriors of the National Basketball Association (NBA) and occasionally for the University of San Francisco men's and women's basketball teams in the National Collegiate Athletic Association (NCAA). The Warriors, who have been located in the San Francisco Bay Area since 1962, played their home games at Oakland Arena in Oakland from 1971 to 2019. Chase Center opened on September 6, 2019, and seats 18,064 for Warriors games.

The arena also includes the Warriors’ practice facility known as the Oracle Performance Center.

Location and design

The location for the arena, which is home to the Golden State Warriors, is in San Francisco at Third St. and 16th St. The arena is composed of multiple layers and floors, has a seating capacity of 18,064 and a multi-purpose area that includes a theater configuration with an entrance overlooking a newly built park. The venue also contains  of office and lab space and has  of retail space. Chase Center also includes a 35,000 square foot public plaza/recreation area designed by landscape architecture firm SWA Group. The arena includes a parking facility of approximately 950 spaces and is accessible to public transportation around the area.

San Francisco Municipal Railway (Muni) is constructing a new light rail subway line that will link the arena and the University of California, San Francisco (UCSF) to downtown hotels, convention centers and subway and commuter rail lines that serve the entire Bay Area. With a $1 billion investment, Chase Center anchors a district of 11 acres of restaurants, cafés, offices, public plazas and a new five-and-a-half-acre public waterfront park.

Development

The plan for building a new arena was announced on May 22, 2012, at a Golden State Warriors press conference at the proposed site, attended by then-San Francisco Mayor Ed Lee, then-NBA Commissioner David Stern, then-California Lt. Governor Gavin Newsom, owners Joe Lacob and Peter Guber, and Warriors staff and city officials. A new privately financed, $500 million 17,000- to 19,000-seat arena was planned to be located on Pier 30-32 along the San Francisco Bay waterfront, situated between the San Francisco Ferry Building and Oracle Park. A month after the proposal, the South Beach-Rincon-Mission Bay Neighborhood Association criticized the site and said that a second major league sport venue in the area would make it no longer "family friendly". Former San Francisco mayor Art Agnos began speaking to dozens of community gatherings in opposition to the proposed arena, stating that the project was pushed by two out-of-town billionaires and would severely impact traffic and city views. On December 30, 2013, a ballot proposition was submitted to the city titled the "Waterfront Height Limit Right to Vote Act". The initiative made it onto the June 2014 ballot as Proposition B, and its passage would affect three major waterfront developments, including the proposed Warriors arena.

On April 19, 2014, the Warriors abandoned plans for the pier site and purchased a 12-acre site owned by Salesforce.com at the Mission Bay neighborhood for an undisclosed amount. The arena was financed privately. The architect for the project was MANICA Architecture and the plan for Chase Center was to have it built by 2019 before the NBA season started. The plan for Chase Center to open earlier was pushed back multiple times due to many complaints about the location. Construction on the arena began in January 2017.

In April 2015, the Mission Bay site was opposed by the Mission Bay Alliance, which cited traffic, lack of parking, and use of space that could go to UCSF expansion among other things as their reasons for opposition. Their complaint was that the arena would be located near UCSF Benioff Children's Hospital and would create more traffic. To avoid the plan to build Chase Center being voided, representatives of the project worked to address these issues such as traffic and parking.

On January 28, 2016, it was announced that JPMorgan Chase had purchased the naming rights of the arena and that it would be known as Chase Center.

The Golden State Warriors had the official groundbreaking ceremony for Chase Center on January 17, 2017.

Opening
The arena had its grand opening on September 6, 2019, with a concert by Metallica and the San Francisco Symphony. The first preseason game at the Chase Center took place on October 5, 2019, as the Warriors lost to the Los Angeles Lakers, 123–101. The Warriors played their first regular season game there with a 141–122 loss against the Los Angeles Clippers on October 24, 2019.

Controversies

Construction and location
Many longtime Oakland residents felt that constructing a new arena for the Warriors is a manifestation of the phenomenon of gentrification. Additionally, many who supported the Warriors throughout their years at Oracle Arena feel betrayed by the team's decision to relocate to San Francisco. There is also the issue of public costs associated with the new arena, both in San Francisco and Oakland.

In the 2018 San Francisco elections, Proposition I was placed on the ballot as "an initiative to discourage the relocation of established sports teams" in direct response to the proposed move of the Warriors from Oakland to San Francisco. Though meant to block the move, the terms of this proposed law were non-binding. Proposition I was defeated on June 5, 2018 after receiving 97,863 votes for the measure compared with 130,916 votes against.

Impact of the COVID-19 pandemic
On March 11, 2020, the City of San Francisco announced a temporary ban on public events and gatherings with over 1,000 people due to the ongoing COVID-19 pandemic. Due to this ban, the Warriors announced that their home games would be played without fans, beginning with the March 12 game against the Brooklyn Nets. However, that same day, one day before the game was scheduled to be played, the NBA announced that it would indefinitely suspend the rest of the 2019–20 season due to the outbreak after Rudy Gobert tested positive for the virus.

Phish concert fall incidents
At a concert by the band Phish on October 17, 2021, an individual fell from an upper level of the Chase Center and died from his injuries. Two other fans were also injured in a fall incident at the venue during the same concert and both survived with non-life-threatening injuries. Several Phish fans who attended the band's two concerts at the venue told local media that they were concerned about the design and safety of barriers and railings that separated the levels of the arena. The San Francisco Department of Building Inspection inspected the arena following an anonymous complaint about the low balcony guardrails and steep staircases that was filed after the concert. On October 21, building inspectors deemed the Chase Center to be compliant with city building codes.

Professional wrestling events
Chase Center has hosted 3 professional wrestling events:
WWE Raw, September 23, 2019 and October 11, 2021
WWE SmackDown, September 24, 2019 (this was the final SmackDown event to air Tuesday nights on the USA Network before its move to Fox on Friday nights the following week)
AEW held their 4th annual Revolution PPV event on March 5, 2023.

Concerts

See also

Sports in the San Francisco Bay Area

References

External links

 

2019 establishments in California
Sports venues completed in 2019
National Basketball Association venues
Basketball venues in California
California Golden Bears basketball venues
Event venues established in 2019
Golden State Warriors venues
San Francisco Dons basketball venues
Music venues in the San Francisco Bay Area
JPMorgan Chase buildings
Sports venues in San Francisco
Music venues completed in 2019